Les Rumsey (born 27 July 1955) is a former speedway rider from England.

Speedway career 
Rumsey rode in the top two tiers of British Speedway from 1972 to 1983, riding for various clubs. In 1975, he finished in the top five averages during the 1975 New National League season. He then began to consistently ride as a heat leader for teams and was regarded as one of the National League's leading riders. He scored a 10+ average for Canterbury in 1978, a 9.92 average for Oxford in 1979 and a 10.19 average in 1981 for Weymouth.

References 

Living people
1955 births
British speedway riders
Canterbury Crusaders riders
Cradley Heathens riders
Crayford Kestrels riders
Exeter Falcons riders
Oxford Cheetahs riders
Weymouth Wildcats riders
Wolverhampton Wolves riders
Sportspeople from Canterbury